Jahanabad (also Romanized as Jahānābād; also known as Zūrābād and Jahādābād) is a village in Silakhor Rural District, Silakhor District, Dorud County, Lorestan Province, Iran. At the 2006 census, its population was 95, in 22 families.

References 

Towns and villages in Dorud County